USS Kansas may refer to:

 , a gunboat which saw action during the American Civil War
 , a Connecticut-class battleship which sailed with the Great White Fleet

See also

United States Navy ship names